Felstead is a village in north-west Essex.

Felstead may also refer to:

Felstead (horse)
Alexandra 'Binky' Felstead, a character in the reality television series Made in Chelsea
Jane 'Mummy' Felstead, Binky's mother, also a character in Made in Chelsea

See also 
 Felsted (disambiguation)